Rear Admiral Michael Julian van Balen  (born 16 February 1961) is a retired senior officer of the Royal Australian Navy (RAN), who served as the Deputy Chief of Navy from 2013 to January 2016.

Early life
van Balen was born in Brisbane, Queensland, on 16 February 1961 to Adrian and Cath van Balen.

Naval career
van Balen joined the Royal Australian Navy in 1978 and graduated from the Royal Australian Naval College in 1982.

van Balen has served in a various billets within the Australian naval high command and United States Navy commands.

He has served on board a variety of Royal Australian Navy ships including HMA ships Barbette, Brisbane, Stalwart, Stuart, Yarra, Bunbury, Derwent, Swan and the United States Navy ship USS Ranger, a  Forrestal-class aircraft carrier.

van Balen completed a Master of Management degree from the Australian Defence Force Academy in 2001. He attended the US Naval War College in 2005.

Honours and awards

RADM van Balen has also been awarded the RAN's "Principal Warfare Officer" badge and the RAN's "Sea Readiness Badge".

References

1961 births
Australian military personnel of the Iraq War
Deputy Chiefs of Navy (Australia)
Graduates of the Royal Australian Naval College
Living people
Naval War College alumni
Officers of the Legion of Merit
Officers of the Order of Australia
Recipients of the Commendation for Distinguished Service
Royal Australian Navy admirals
Military personnel from Brisbane
University of New South Wales alumni